CBAX may refer to:

 CBAX (AM), a radio rebroadcaster (600 AM) licensed to McAdam, New Brunswick, Canada, rebroadcasting CBZF-FM
 CBAX-FM, a radio station (91.5 FM) licensed to Halifax, Nova Scotia, Canada